Domaniewice may refer to the following places:
Domaniewice, Lesser Poland Voivodeship (south Poland)
Domaniewice, Łódź Voivodeship (central Poland)
Domaniewice, Białobrzegi County in Masovian Voivodeship (east-central Poland)
Domaniewice, Grójec County in Masovian Voivodeship (east-central Poland)